Hosanna is a liturgical word in Judaism and Christianity.

Hosanna may also refer to:

Liturgy and music 
 Hosanna shout, a Mormon ritual
 "Hosanna", a song from Jesus Christ Superstar
 "Hosanna" (A. R. Rahman song), an Indian song with versions in Tamil, Hindi, and Telugu
 "Hosanna" (Paul McCartney song), song on the album New
 "Hosanna" (Kirk Franklin song)
 "Hosianna, Davids son", a 1795 Advent song
 Hosanna: Top 10 Worship Songs, an album by VeggieTales
 Hosianna (album), a 2013 album by Lars Winnerbäck
 Osanna, an Italian rock band
 Hosanna! Music,  a Christian music record label

Places and jurisdictions 
 Hosanna (Ethiopia), an East African city 
 Apostolic Vicariate of Hosanna, Ethiopian Catholic pre-diocesan mission territory with see
 Hosanna Meeting House, an African American church in Pennsylvania

Other 
 Château Hosanna, a winery in the Bordeaux region Pomerol
 Hosanna (play), a 1973 play by Michel Tremblay
 Hosanna Kabakoro (born 1992), editor of Mai Life Style